Irfan Zafar Leghari is a Pakistani politician who has been a member of the National Assembly of Pakistan since August 2018.

Political career
He was elected to the National Assembly of Pakistan from Constituency NA-234 (Dadu-I) as a candidate of Pakistan Peoples Party in 2018 Pakistani general election.

References

Living people
Pakistani MNAs 2018–2023
Pakistan People's Party politicians
Year of birth missing (living people)